Harold Hindle (17 July 1883 – 1937) was an English footballer who played as a centre-half or left-half in the Football League for Blackburn Rovers and in the Southern League for West Ham United.

Hindle made two League appearances for Blackburn Rovers before moving to Nelson of the Lancashire Combination. He then moved to West Ham United, along with Blackburn teammates Lionel Watson and Fred Blackburn, and played in the first two games of the 1905–06 season. He made one other appearance for West Ham, against Reading on 28 October 1905.

He later played for Hurst.

References

1883 births
1937 deaths
Footballers from Ashton-under-Lyne
English footballers
Association football central defenders
Association football wing halves
Oswaldtwistle Rovers F.C. players
Blackburn Rovers F.C. players
Nelson F.C. players
West Ham United F.C. players
Ashton United F.C. players
English Football League players
Southern Football League players